South Carolina is one of the Southern United States and has produced a number of renowned performers of jazz, rock, blues, R&B, country, bluegrass and other popular styles.

Official music
South Carolina is noted for being the birthplace of beach music, an offshoot of early R&B and rock 'n' roll that featured a shuffling beat which spawned the dance called The Shag.  This Myrtle Beach-area dance is the official State Dance, although South Carolina has also contributed to two other famous dances, the Charleston in the 1920s, and the Big Apple in the 1930s.

South Carolina also has two official state songs: "Carolina", composed in 1911 with words by Henry Timrod and music by Anne Custis Burgess, and "South Carolina on My Mind", written in 1985 by Buzz Arledge and Hank Martin.  The State also has an "official music", Negro spirituals, sacred Christian songs originally developed in the 19th century.

South Carolina musicians
Perhaps the best known rock band to hail from South Carolina is Columbia's Hootie & the Blowfish, but other groups such as Spartanburg's The Marshall Tucker Band, The Swinging Medallions, Maurice Williams and the Zodiacs, alternative metal band Crossfade from Columbia, Charleston's indie Band of Horses, Southern rock band Needtobreathe, and Blue Dogs also hail from the Palmetto State.

Jazz saxophonist Chris Potter from Columbia has released 20 CDs as a leader and performed as a sideman on more than 150 other albums. He is the leader of the Chris Potter Underground and has regularly performed with many world-class jazz musicians including Dave Holland and Pat Metheny. In the December, 2014 issue of Down Beat magazine, which featured the results of the annual readers poll, Potter was named the number one tenor saxophonist in the world.

Other prominent musicians and singers born and/or raised in the state include soul/jazz musicians James Brown, Brook Benton, Maxine Brown, Dizzy Gillespie, Chubby Checker, Eartha Kitt, Peabo Bryson, Persona Bell, Arthur Smith, Cat Anderson, Tom Delaney, Freddie Green, Drink Small, Johnny Helms, Terry Rosen, Jabbo Smith, Bill Benford, Tommy Benford, Nick Ashford, Darius Rucker, rock/country musicians  John Phillips(Mamas & Papas), Josh Turner, Bill Anderson, Edwin McCain, Duncan Sheik, Rob Thomas, Marcus King, Walter Hyatt, David Ball, and Esquerita.

Country/bluegrass
The state's bluegrass scene has produced important bands such as The Hired Hands featuring pioneering three-finger banjo player Dewitt "Snuffy" Jenkins and old time fiddler Homer "Pappy" Sherrill. Other notable groups are The Hinson Girls, featuring four sisters from Lancaster, and Palmetto Blue, featuring two South Carolina Folk Heritage Award Recipients: Chris Boutwell (2014) and Ashley Carder (2012), along with vocalist and bassist Shellie Davis, banjoist Steve Willis, flatpicking guitarist Edward Dalton, and South Carolina junior fiddle champion Ella Thomas.  Bluesmen Pink Anderson (namesake for Pink Floyd; buried in Spartanburg) and Reverend Gary Davis were both from Laurens, S.C. Charleston's Roger Bellow, a South Carolina Folk Heritage Award Recipient and former host of the "Vintage Country" radio show on SCETV radio and WYLA-LP, leads the long-running country/swing band The Drifting Troubadours.

Soul/R&B
The Beach music classic "Stay" by Lancaster's Maurice Williams and the Zodiacs was #1 on the Billboard Hot 100 in 1960. James Brown's (buried in Aiken County) soul and funk song "I Got You (I Feel Good)" was #3 on the Hot 100 in 1965, and #1 on the Rhythm and Blues Singles. Greenville's Peabo Bryson's R&B song "A Whole New World" from Aladdin was #1 on the Billboard Hot 100 in 1993.

Rock/pop
Hootie & The Blowfish's roots rock song "Only Wanna Be With You" was #1 on the Mainstream Top 40 chart in 1995. Hootie's debut album Cracked Rear View was the best-selling album of 1995, the 7th best-selling album of the 90s, and is the 19th-best-selling album List of best-selling albums in the United States of all time. Their 2nd album Fairweather Johnson also went to #1 on the Billboard 200 in 1996.

The Upstate band Needtobreathe had a #2 album on the Billboard 200 with Hard Love in 2016. Indie folk singer Iron & Wine had a #2 album on the Billboard 200 with Kiss Each Other Clean in 2011. Country star Darius Rucker has had two #2 albums on the Billboard 200: Charleston, SC 1966 in 2010 and True Believers in 2013, as well as 9 #1 songs on the Country Airplay chart from 2008 to 2020. Country singer Josh Turner from Florence County had a #2 album on the Billboard 200 with Your Man in 2006. And country singer Lee Brice from Sumter had 2 #5 albums on the Billboard 200 with Hard 2 Love in 2012 and I Don't Dance in 2014. Toro y Moi, a popular electronic artist (who had a #1 album on the Dance Chart with Anything in Return in 2013), and rapper Lil Ru are both from Columbia.

Urban centers in the state including Greenville, Columbia, Myrtle Beach, and Charleston continue to have thriving rock and hip hop scenes.

Prominent venues
The region of Myrtle Beach has been home to the well-known Carolina Opry, a country music-based variety show, established in 1986 by singer, producer and entrepreneur, Calvin Gilmore, South Carolina's official country music ambassador, who continues to produce and perform in the show today.  The Carolina Opry was the first live family entertainment venue on the Grand Strand and helped turn Myrtle Beach into one of the major centers for country music on the East Coast.  Local venues include the Dolly Parton's Pirates Voyage, one of many attractions owned by Dolly Parton, the Alabama Theater, named for the band Alabama. Other artists tried their hand with their own theaters which did not last, such as Ronnie Milsap and the Gatlin Brothers.  Myrtle Beach is also home to the South Carolina State Bluegrass Festival. The Carolina Country Music Fest has been held on the Myrtle Beach boardwalk since 2015.

Outside of Myrtle Beach, the town of West Columbia is notable as the home of Bill Wells of the Blue Ridge Mountain Grass; he is the owner of a local music shop, which hosts a weekly bluegrass show at the Pickin' Parlor.

Lesser known venues include the Radio Room in Greenville, Ground Zero in Spartanburg, the New Brookland Tavern in West Columbia and the House of Blues in North Myrtle Beach as well as the Pour House on James Island, and the Music Farm with locations in downtown Charleston and Columbia. The Five Points district in Columbia features a variety of bands each year at its St. Patrick's Day festival.

Charleston's WYLA FM (97.5 mHz) programs almost entirely local and in-state artists. The station broadcasts 24 hours per day from studios at the Charleston County Main Library, where they also host live performances.

Lists of musicians and bands
Musicians

Gus Aiken, jazz trumpeter 
Bill Anderson, country singer 
BC Villanova, musician
Cat Anderson, jazz trumpeter 
Pinkney "Pink" Anderson, Piedmont blues singer
Nick Ashford
Brook Benton
John Blackwell 
Lee Brice, country singer
Ben Bridwell, singer
Arthur Briggs, jazz trumpeter and bandleader
James Brown
Maxine Brown, soul singer
Peabo Bryson
Chazwick Bundick
Chubby Checker
Julian Dash, jazz tenor saxophonist 
Reverend Gary Davis, blues and gospel singer and guitarist
Ray Davis
Tom Delaney
Jacks Flat (musician, songwriter, and singer)
Ronnie Free, jazz drummer
Dizzy Gillespie, jazz trumpeter
Trevor Hall, reggae rock
Jimmy Hamilton, jazz clarinetist and saxophonist
Johnny Helms, jazz trumpeter
Bertha Hill, blues singer
Danielle Howle, singer and guitarist
J.B. Hutto, blues singer and guitarist
James Jamerson, bassist
Buddy Johnson, jazz pianist and bandleader 
Ella Johnson, jazz singer 
Etta Jones, jazz singer
Rufus "Speedy" Jones, jazz drummer
Taft Jordan, jazz trumpeter
Norman Keenan, jazz double bassist 
Aubrey Key, Singer 
Eartha Kitt, jazz singer and actress
Linda Martell 
Edwin McCain
Josie Miles, blues singer
James "Bubber" Miley, jazz trumpeter 
Pete Minger, bebop jazz trumpeter 
Alphonse Mouzon, jazz drummer
Houston Person, jazz tenor saxophonist and bandleader 
John Phillips
Bill Pinkney, singer
Chris Potter, jazz saxophonist and composer
Arthur Prysock, jazz singer 
Susan Reed, singer
Terry Rosen, jazz guitarist
Darius Rucker, singer
Snookum Russell, pianist and bandleader 
Duncan Sheik, singer-songwriter 
Drink Small, blues guitarist and singer
Cliff Smalls, pianist, trombonist and bandleader 
Chris Smith, composer
Clara Smith, blues singer
Cootie Stark, Piedmont bluesman
Angie Stone, pop vocalist
Baby Tate, Piedmont blues 
James "J.T." Taylor, singer
Rob Thomas, singer-songwriter
Lucky Thompson, jazz saxophonist 
Melanie Thornton, La Bouche singer
Aaron Tippin, country singer
Buck Trent, country singer and musician
Josh Turner, country singer
James Blood Ulmer, jazz guitarist
Blind Willie Walker, Piedmont blues 
Baby Washington, soul singer
Ron Westray, jazz trombonist
Sandy Williams, jazz trombonist 
Josh White, Piedmont blues singer and guitarist
Webster Young, jazz trumpeter

Bands

Atlas Road Crew – Columbia
Aubrey Key and The Aubrey keys - Clemson and Jonesville 
Band of Horses – Charleston
Bedlam Hour - Columbia
Brother – Columbia (1969 – 75)
Captain Easy - Columbia
Carolina Liar – Moncks Corner
Chasen – Greenville
Cravin' Melon – Clemson
Crossfade – Columbia
Daddy's Beemer – Clemson
Deepfield – Charleston
Discomfort
The Dubplates – Charleston
Emery – Rock Hill
The Explorers Club – Charleston
Graves of Valor – Florence
Guyana Punch Line – Columbia
Hootie & the Blowfish – Columbia
Hundredth – Myrtle Beach
I Nine – Orangeburg
Iron & Wine – Chapin
Islander – Greenville
In/Humanity
Jump, Little Children – Charleston
Madam Adam – Charleston
The Movement (reggae band) – Columbia
The Marshall Tucker Band – Spartanburg
Marytre (pronounced "merry tree")
Maurice Williams and the Zodiacs – Lancaster
needtobreathe – Seneca
Nile – Greenville
Sanctuary – Columbia (1975 – 78)
Sent By Ravens – Hartsville
The Sequence – Columbia
Sequoyah Prep School – Florence
Shovels & Rope – Charleston
The Sparkletones – Spartanburg
Stretch Arm Strong – Irmo
Susto – Charleston
The Swinging Medallions – Greenwood
Through the Eyes of the Dead – Florence
Uncle Walt's Band – Spartanburg
Villa*Nova - Columbia
WARHEAD – Charleston
Wildfire – Columbia (1969 – 73)
The Working Title – Charleston
Souls Harbor

See also
Beach Music
Piedmont blues 
Jenkins Orphanage, Charleston
Appalachian music 
Indigenous music of North America#Eastern Woodlands

References

External links
Local Music Scene SC
Reverend Gary Davis
Pinkney "Pink" Anderson
Scene SC

 
South Carolina
South Carolina culture
South Carolina